Christophe Prigent is a former French slalom canoeist who competed from the late 1970s to the late 1980s. He won two medals in the K-1 team event at the ICF Canoe Slalom World Championships with a silver in 1985 and a bronze in 1987.

References

French male canoeists
Living people
Year of birth missing (living people)
Medalists at the ICF Canoe Slalom World Championships